The Boathouse District is a row of boathouses and attractions along the Oklahoma River in Oklahoma City. The Boathouse District offers activities such as recreational and elite rowing and kayaking, fitness facilities, private event spaces and RIVERSPORT Adventures, an outdoor adventure park. The Oklahoma City Boathouse Foundation, which manages the Boathouse District, has been named a U.S. Olympic & Paralympic Training Site by the U.S. Olympic Committee.

History
The development of the Boathouse District began with the early 1990s revitalization of the seven-mile section of the North Canadian River that runs through Oklahoma City. As rowing gained popularity in Oklahoma City on Lake Overholser, Mike and Tempe Knopp, leaders of the Oklahoma Association for Rowing, discovered that the Oklahoma River would be a perfect waterway for rowing. The Oklahoma Association of Rowing, began a grassroots effort to build a boathouse along the shores of the Oklahoma River. Aubrey McClendon and Clay Bennett soon took interest in the project and helped secured funding for the multimillion-dollar boathouse.

The first boathouse in the Boathouse District, the Chesapeake Boathouse, was built in 2006. The Devon Boathouse was completed in 2010, followed by the Chesapeake Finish Line Tower in 2011. The CHK|Central Boathouse is currently under construction and is scheduled to open in spring 2015. Plans for the University of Oklahoma Boathouse are underway.

Chesapeake Boathouse
The Chesapeake Boathouse, built in 2006, was the first structure on the newly revitalized Oklahoma River. Today it anchors the Boathouse District and serves as the community boathouse on the river.

The design is the vision of Oklahoma City architect Rand Elliott with primary funding for the project provided by Chesapeake Energy Corporation.

The design of the Chesapeake Boathouse represents a sleek rowing shell with translucent polycarbonate walls offering a dramatic nighttime image of the building “floating” above the river. Sixteen columns of light representing oars highlight the reflecting pool at the “bow” of the building. Features of the $3.5 million facility include:

 Deck, lobby, and event room for receptions and meetings
 Boat bays to store up to 124 rowing shells
 A panoramic 24-ft. wall of glass overlooking the deck, river, and reflecting pool
 Event room with a 62-foot window revealing the boat bays
 Fully equipped fitness/training room overlooking the river

Devon Boathouse
The Devon Boathouse is the home of Oklahoma City University Rowing and Canoe/Kayak and headquarters for the OKC National High Performance Center. The OKC National High Performance Center provides training opportunities for Olympic hopefuls in both rowing and canoe/kayak.

Designed for OCU by Rand Elliott, Elliott & Associates Architects, the Devon Boathouse is one in a series of iconic boathouses in the Boathouse District at the Oklahoma River in Oklahoma City. Its dramatic architecture creates a striking image against the backdrop of Oklahoma City’s downtown skyline and creates the impression of the boathouse’s “prow” breaking the river’s edge.

Soaring spaces created by glass and polycarbonate walls are flooded with natural light and include a two-story boat bay and the Ann Lacy Event Center. Expansive windows offer unobstructed views of the Oklahoma River and a second story balcony overlooks the boat bay ramps and docks. Blue LED lights accent the exterior of the boathouse at night, adding to the dramatic images of the Chesapeake Boathouse and OGE Together Lightscape on the river.

Chesapeake Finish Line Tower
The Chesapeake Finish Line Tower was designed by Oklahoma architect Rand Elliott. The 60 foot tower is clearly visible from Interstate 35. The 7,500 square foot building has four levels. These include a welcome center, finish line jury/timing seats, commentary/media/race control and a VIP Viewing Gallery and observation deck.

The Chesapeake Finish Line Tower has the newest in race technology and meets the standards for both FISA, the international governing body for rowing, and the International Canoe Federation. The finish line for the Oklahoma River is attached to the tower itself and is graphically represented on nearby sidewalks and inside the building as a continuous red line. Outside, terraced seating is provided for spectators to have an outdoor view of the finish line.

CHK|Central Boathouse
The CHK|Central Boathouse serves as home to the University of Central Oklahoma’s women’s rowing team. It also includes a live music venue and an art gallery, establishing it as a unique presence “where art meets the river” in the Boathouse District at the Oklahoma River. The CHK|Central Boathouse opened in April 2015 and is the newest boathouse in the Boathouse District.

OU Boathouse
Plans for the University of Oklahoma Boathouse, home to the OU Women’s NCAA Division I program, are underway. The facility has received $2 million in funding as part of a $12.5 million donation to support OU academics and athletics from Aubrey and Kathleen McClendon.

RIVERSPORT Rapids
RIVERSPORT Rapids is a non-profit recreational and athletic training whitewater and rafting center. The $45.6 million project is fully funded by MAPS 3, a temporary voter-approved sales tax increase.

RIVERSPORT Adventures
RIVERSPORT Adventures is a non-profit outdoor adventure park in Oklahoma City. It is home to the SandRidge Sky Zip, Sky Trail, Slide and Rumble Drop, along with recreational kayaking, stand up paddle boarding and many other adventures.

References

Redeveloped ports and waterfronts in the United States
Oklahoma City